The white-bellied canary (Crithagra dorsostriata) is a species of finch in the family Fringillidae.
It is found in Ethiopia, Kenya, Somalia, South Sudan, Tanzania, and Uganda.
Its natural habitat is dry savanna.

The white-bellied canary was formerly placed in the genus Serinus but phylogenetic analysis using mitochondrial and nuclear DNA sequences found that the genus was polyphyletic. The genus was therefore split and a number of species including the white-bellied canary were moved to the resurrected genus Crithagra.

References

white-bellied canary
Birds of East Africa
white-bellied canary
Taxonomy articles created by Polbot